Juan Carlos Pozo Muñoz (born 21 January 1981) is a retired Spanish footballer who played as a central midfielder.

External links
Eurofotbal.cz Profile

References

1981 births
Living people
Association football midfielders
Spanish footballers
Spanish expatriate footballers
1. FC Tatran Prešov players
Slovak Super Liga players
Expatriate footballers in Slovakia
Spanish expatriate sportspeople in Slovakia